Shanta Holdings Limited (SHL) is a diversified conglomerate based in Dhaka, Bangladesh. Khondoker Monir Uddin is the managing director of the group.

History 
In 1988, Shanta entered the ready-made garment (RMG) sector, becoming one of the pioneers in exporting RMGs with companies such as Shanta Garments Ltd, Shanta Industries Ltd, Shanta Wash Works Ltd, GDS Chemicals Ltd, and Shanta Denims Ltd. In 2010, the group decided to focus on real estate development instead of the RMG sector and the group sold their stake to Dewhirst Group Limited in order to pursue their dream.

In 1997, Shanta Group merged some of their assets with Tropica Group and Sepal Group to form STS Group. STS Group is the owner of Evercare Hospital Dhaka, International School of Dakar, and the DPS STS Schools, Dhaka. 

Some of the company's notable projects include the Safura Tower, Shanta Western Tower at Tejgaon, International School Dhaka (ISD) at Bashundhara, and Delhi Public School at Uttara. Shanta Holding was also involved in the construction of Evercare Hospital Dhaka. Shanta is building Shanta Pinnacle, 40 storied, and Shanta Forum Twin Towers. It constructed the building of Amari Hotel Dhaka.

Subsidiaries 

 Shanta Lifestyle
 Shanta Securities Limited
 Shanta Asset Management Limited
 Shanta Multiverse
 The White Canary Café
 Shanta Equity Limited

Board of directors

References

2005 establishments in Bangladesh
Conglomerate companies of Bangladesh
Companies based in Dhaka